"I Useta Lover" (eye dialect of "I used to love her") is a 1990 song by Irish rock group The Saw Doctors. It is the second single off the If This Is Rock and Roll, I Want My Old Job Back album. It stayed at the #1 position in the Irish chart for nine weeks and became one of the best-selling singles of all time in the country.  A similar clerically influenced  message is seen in other Saw Doctors songs, notably "Bless Me Father" and "Tommy K".

The chorus of the song was originally taken from a song of the same name which was performed by Davy Carton's first band, Blaze X. The original song had been written by Paul Cunniffe. The Blaze X version of the song appears as a B-side on some versions of the single.

References

1990 singles
Irish rock songs
Irish Singles Chart number-one singles
1990 songs